The 2020 season was the New York Jets' 51st in the National Football League, their 61st overall, their second under general manager Joe Douglas and their second and final under head coach Adam Gase. They failed to improve upon their 7–9 record from 2019 or return to the playoffs for the first time since 2010. Their 2–14 record was their worst record since their 1996 campaign in which they went 1–15, and shortly after the Jets closed their season with a loss to the New England Patriots the team fired Gase as head coach.

The Jets became the first team to be eliminated from playoff contention after a loss in Week 11 dropped them to 0–10. They continued their losing streak to week 14, resulting in a franchise-worst 0–13 start, before they claimed their first victory in Week 15 against the Los Angeles Rams to prevent a winless season. With the Cleveland Browns and Tampa Bay Buccaneers qualifying for the postseason for the first time since 2002 and 2007 respectively, the Jets now have the longest active postseason drought in the NFL, with 2010 being the last season the Jets qualified for the postseason.

On July 20, the Jets confirmed that their home games would take place behind closed doors due to the ongoing COVID-19 pandemic in the United States.

Roster Changes

Free Agents

Unrestricted

Restricted

Exclusive-Rights

Signings

Releases

Draft

Pre-Draft Trades
The Jets traded defensive end Leonard Williams to the New York Giants in exchange for a 2020 third-round selection and a conditional fifth-round selection in the 2021 NFL Draft.
The Jets traded a seventh-round selection to the Baltimore Ravens in exchange for guard Alex Lewis.
In-Draft Trades
The Jets traded a second-round selection (48th) to the Seattle Seahawks in exchange for a second- and a third-round selection (59th and 101st).
The New York Jets traded a third-round selection (101st) to the New England Patriots in exchange for two fourth-round selections (125th and 129th) and a 2021 sixth-round selection.
The Jets traded their sixth-round selection (211th) to the Indianapolis Colts in exchange for CB Quincy Wilson.

Undrafted free agents

Staff

Final roster

Preseason
The Jets' preseason schedule was announced on May 7, but was later cancelled due to the COVID-19 pandemic.

Regular season

Schedule
The Jets' 2020 schedule was announced on May 7.

Note: Intra-division opponents are in bold text.

Game summaries

Week 1: at Buffalo Bills

The Jets started their season with a loss, starting 0–1.

Week 2: vs. San Francisco 49ers

The Jets have not won a home opener since 2015. The Jets dropped to 0–2.

Week 3: at Indianapolis Colts

With the loss, the Jets dropped to 0–3.

Week 4: vs. Denver Broncos

With the loss, the Jets dropped to 0-4 for a second straight season.  It marked the first time in franchise history they've had two straight seasons where they started 0–4.

Week 5: vs. Arizona Cardinals

With a 30–10 loss to the Cardinals in Week 5, the Jets experienced their first 0–5 start since their disastrous 1996 season. Two days later, the Jets released disgruntled running back Le'Veon Bell less than two years after signing him to a massive contract. This was also the first of two games in which backup Quarterback Joe Flacco started due to injuries to starting Quarterback Sam Darnold.

Week 6: at Miami Dolphins

With the shutout loss (the first shutout of the season), the Jets started 0-6 for the first time since the 1996 season. With the Giants and Falcons winning their first games this week, this left the Jets as the only winless team in the NFL for 2020.

Week 7: vs. Buffalo Bills

Amidst heavy criticism, Head Coach Adam Gase gave up offensive play calling duties, instead leaving it to Offensive Coordinator Dowell Loggains. Under Loggains, the Jets were able to build a 10–6 lead over the Bills by halftime after a Sergio Castillo field goal and La'Mical Perine touchdown. Despite this, the Jets offense struggled in the second half. While the Jets were able to prevent Buffalo from scoring touchdowns, the Bills were able to score enough field goals to hand the Jets an 18–10 loss. With this loss, the Jets dropped to 0-7 for the first time since 1996.

Week 8: at Kansas City Chiefs

With the loss, the Jets fell to 0–8. It would be their first such start since 1996.

Week 9: vs. New England Patriots

After Sam Darnold suffered a shoulder injury, Joe Flacco would start for the New York Jets once again. Facing an injury-plagued New England Patriots team, the game was seen as a big chance for the Jets to get their first win of the season. Flacco threw touchdown passes to Breshad Perriman and Jamison Crowder, alongside two Sergio Castillo field goals to lead 20–10 at halftime. However, the Patriots rallied and in the final five minutes of the game, following a crucial interception by Joe Flacco, the Patriots were able to tie the game 27–27. As time expired, Nick Folk kicked the game winning field goal for the New England win. With the loss, the Jets started 0–9 for the first time in franchise history. They were also eliminated from AFC East division title contention for the 18th consecutive year.

Week 11: at Los Angeles Chargers

The Jets started 0-10 for the first time in franchise history. With this loss, along with the Colts beating the Packers, the Jets became the first team to be eliminated from playoff contention.

Week 12: vs. Miami Dolphins

The Jets started 0-11 for the first time in franchise history, and their only score in the entire game came from a field goal put up in the first quarter by Sergio Castillo.

Week 13: vs. Las Vegas Raiders

The Jets led much of the early portions of the game, scoring two early touchdowns and holding a 13–7 lead. Despite giving up the next seventeen points and entering the fourth quarter trailing by eleven, the Jets scored twice and reclaimed the lead with 5:34 remaining. On the ensuing Las Vegas drive, the Raiders were stopped on fourth down inside the New York 10-yard line when Derek Carr threw an incompletion on fourth down after offsetting penalties negated a first down.

The Jets forced the Raiders to use their remaining time outs on their possession and punted the ball back to them, leaving the Raiders sixty-one yards from the end zone with thirty-five seconds left. Carr managed to get Las Vegas into New York territory on the first play of the drive, with Darren Waller hauling in a completion to the 46-yard line. After spiking the ball to stop the clock, Carr threw two consecutive incompletions to bring up third down with thirteen seconds showing.

On third down, Jets defensive coordinator Gregg Williams decided to call for a play referred to as a zero blitz, which results in nearly every defender rushing the play and a lone defensive back remaining in coverage. The call backfired on the Jets as receiver Henry Ruggs was able to get past rookie cornerback Lamar Jackson, leaving himself wide open and enabling Carr to easily find him for the go-ahead touchdown with five seconds left. The Raiders won the game 31–28.

With the loss, the Jets fell to 0–12 for the first time in franchise history, becoming the first team to start 0–12 since the 2017 Browns, who failed to win a game that season. After the game Williams drew criticism for his play call from the media, players, and coach Adam Gase and after discussions between Gase and team administrators, Williams was relieved of his duties the following day.

Week 14: at Seattle Seahawks

The Jets suffered a blowout loss in their second trip to the West Coast in the season. The game is known for being Seahawks safety Jamal Adams' first game against the Jets since Gang Green traded him in the 2020 offseason. Another ex-Jet, quarterback Geno Smith, came into the game late in the third quarter. The Jets extend their franchise-worst start to 0–13, and the 13 losses in a row also set a franchise record.

Week 15: at Los Angeles Rams

The Jets entered the game as 17-point underdogs. They dominated in the first half and never once gave up the lead. After the Rams failed to convert on fourth down, that allowed the Jets to kneel and improve to 1–13. This win also prevented the Jets from joining the 2017 Cleveland Browns and 2008 Detroit Lions as among the only teams to finish 0–16. The Jets are also the first team to win after starting 0-13 since the 2011 Indianapolis Colts.

Week 16: vs. Cleveland Browns

The Jets defeated the Browns for the first time since 2017 as they avoided their first 1-win season since 1996. With the win, the Jets relinquished the 1st overall pick in the 2021 NFL Draft to Jacksonville.

Week 17: at New England Patriots

The loss ended the Jets season at 2–14. With the Cleveland Browns and Tampa Bay Buccaneers clinching playoff spots, the Jets now hold the longest active postseason drought in the NFL, dating back to 2010. This would be the last time Sam Darnold would start for the Jets as he would be traded to the Carolina Panthers during the off-season. The Jets were also the only team to lose all 6 games in the division.

Standings

Division

Conference

References

External links
 

New York Jets
New York Jets seasons
New York Jets season
21st century in East Rutherford, New Jersey
Meadowlands Sports Complex